Kumiko Watanabe (born 10 May 1936) is a Japanese diver. She competed at the 1960 Summer Olympics and the 1964 Summer Olympics.

References

1936 births
Living people
Japanese female divers
Olympic divers of Japan
Divers at the 1960 Summer Olympics
Divers at the 1964 Summer Olympics
Sportspeople from Tokyo
Asian Games medalists in diving
Divers at the 1958 Asian Games
Medalists at the 1958 Asian Games
Asian Games gold medalists for Japan
20th-century Japanese women